

The Bisnovat 5 (Бисноват 5) was a supersonic research aircraft designed in the USSR in the late 1940s, inspired by the German DFS 346 aircraft that was captured by Soviet troops towards the end of World War II.

The Bisnovat 5 was ordered into development to provide an all-Soviet alternative to an aircraft built with foreign technology. Originally intended to take-off from the ground, gliding flights were carried out from a Petlyakov Pe-8 mothership, similar to the way that the Bell X-1 was dropped from a B-29 Superfortress mothership.

Unpowered flight tests revealed poor stability and dangerous landing characteristics with 5-1,(first prototype), being damaged beyond repair after the third gliding flight. Flight tests with Aircraft 5-2, fitted with a 45 degree swept fin of greater aspect ratio to improve directional stability, resumed on 26 January 1949, but further delays were caused by the pilot landing off the runway causing serious damage. To improve the landing stability 5-2 was modified with wing-tip skids, at the end of downturned wing-tips with 45 degrees anhedral, and a single skid on the centreline, as well as a ventral fin at the rear. 
Flying and landing qualities were much improved, but progress was slow  and the Bisnovat 5 was cancelled without the aircraft making a single powered flight and only sixteen gliding flights, between 14 July 1948 and November 1949, during which a maximum speed of 0.775M was attained.

Specifications (Bisnovat 5)

References

References

External links
 

1940s Soviet experimental aircraft
Bisnovat aircraft
Cancelled aircraft projects